The Chief Sealth Trail is a multi-use recreational trail in Seattle, Washington.

The 3.6-mile (6 km) trail, which opened on May 12, 2007, follows the Seattle City Light transmission right-of-way from S. Dawson Street and Beacon Avenue S. in Beacon Hill, near Jefferson Park, to S. Gazelle Street and 51st Avenue S. in Rainier Valley, near Kubota Gardens. Extensions are planned northward to Downtown and southward to the city limits.

The trail was constructed from the recycling of excavated soils and concrete from the construction of Link light rail along Martin Luther King Jr. Way in South Seattle.

References

Beacon Hill, Seattle
Geography of Seattle